Penrose is a Cornish-language surname. The surname Penrose is derived from one of the places called Penrose in England and Wales: these are found in ten parishes in Cornwall (including Penrose near Porthleven), several times in Wales and once in Herefordshire.

People
Notable people with the name include:

 Barrie Penrose (1942–2020), British investigative journalist, interviewer and trainer
 Billy Penrose (1925–1962), English jazz musician
 Boies Penrose (1860–1921), American lawyer and Republican Senator from Philadelphia
 Charles Penrose (disambiguation), multiple people
 Craig Penrose (born 1953), American football player
 Edith Penrose (1914–1996), British economist 
 Emily Penrose (1858–1942), Principal of Somerville College, Oxford University
 Francis Penrose (1817–1903), British architect, archaeologist and astronomer
 George William Penrose, Lord Penrose (born 1938), Scottish judge
 James Doyle Penrose (1862–1932), Irish painter, father of Lionel and Roland Penrose
 John Penrose (actor) (1914–1983), British actor
 John Penrose (archer) (1850–1932), British archer
 John Penrose (clergyman) (1778–1859), Church of England clergyman and theological writer
 John Penrose (Parliamentarian) (born 1611), English member of Parliament
 John Penrose (politician) (born 1964), British Conservative member of Parliament
 Jonathan Penrose (1933–2021), English chess grandmaster, son of Lionel Penrose
 Lionel Penrose (1898–1972), English geneticist, father of Oliver, Roger and Jonathan Penrose 
Martin Penrose, Irish footballer 
 Oliver Penrose (born 1929), English mathematician, son of Lionel Penrose
 R. A. F. Penrose, Jr. (1863–1931), American mining geologist and entrepreneur
 Sir Roger Penrose (born 1931), English mathematical physicist (son of Lionel Penrose)
 Roland Penrose (1900–1984), English artist, historian and poet
 Scott Penrose (born 1969), British magician, magic and illusion consultant
 Spencer Penrose (1865–1939), American mining magnate, philanthropist and hotelier
 Thomas Penrose (1742–1779), clergyman and poet
 Tricia Penrose (born 1970), English actress and singer
 Valentine Penrose (1898–1978), French poet, author and collagist
 Brigadier general William H. Penrose (William Henry Penrose) (1832–1903), Union Army officer
 Willie Penrose (born 1956), Irish Labour Party politician

Fictional characters
 Llewellin Penrose, fictional character in the novel, Mr. Penrose: The Journal of Penrose, Seaman by William Williams (1727–1791)

Footnotes

Cornish-language surnames